Mihailo Ristić (5 September 1864 – 15 August 1925) was a Serbian diplomat and consul. From 1899 to 1903 he was the consul of the Serbian consulate in Bitola.

References

19th-century Serbian people
20th-century Serbian people
Diplomats from Belgrade
1864 births
1925 deaths
People from the Kingdom of Serbia